Magomana is a small village located in Mwenezi (District). A string of mountains separates it from the main wall of Manyuchi Dam, less than five miles away in the north. The village is found on a watershed within the Maranda communal lands south of the Mwenezi River but north of the Mushawe River.

Geography 
Typical of the whole district, the village's climate is hot and arid. Rainfall is erratic and the vegetation is savanna dominated by grasses and Mopane trees. In the days of old, the villagers used to plant millet and sorghum but these days most villagers plant maize on account of the high yields associated with it.

Education 
Recently, the residents came together and decided to contribute to the building of Manyuchi Primary School. Before the school was built, primary kids from the village had to travel 9miles/15 km to Dengenya Primary School in the south or up to Furidzi Primary which was even further away. The new primary school is located close to the gravel road from Murove & Sengejira, less than three miles from Manyuchi Dam.

Politics & government 
The village is Ward 9, under Chief Maranda with headman Chizivano Magomana as the leader of the village. The village falls in Mwenezi West constituency for the 2008 elections.

Services

Roads & Transport 
The basic mode of transport in village is by donkey cart. Families use the donkey-carts to travel to business centers like Sarahura, Sengejira, Chaoma and Maranda to shop and have their dried maize ground by the grinding mills. There is a gravel road that joins the Sarahura in the north with Maranda is the south that passes at the edge of the village. The bridge at Mwenezi River just before the village, was destroyed by floods due to Cyclone Eline in 2000 and has been repaired.

Water, electricity & phones 
During the long dry periods, the villagers draw their water from Manyuchi Dam. In recent years, there has been attempts to create an irrigation scheme that would utilize water from the dam. Like other villagers in Mwenezi (District), there is not electricity in the village, though a phone runs past to Maranda.

References 

Mwenezi (District)
Populated places in Masvingo Province